Wagner Miranda Schwartz (Rio de Janeiro, Volta Redonda, 2 December 1972) is a Brazilian performer, choreographer and writer.

Biography 
He was born in Volta Redonda, in the State of Rio de Janeiro. He began his studies of popular music and drama in the public schools of Volta Redonda. Later, at the Federal University of Uberlândia, Wagner studied modernist literature and art, which influences his approach to choreography, receiving the award of the Art Foundation Itau Cultural in 2000–2001, 2003–2004, 2009–2010, 2014. In 2005 and 2009 he collaborated with the choreographer Rachid Ouramdane in Cover, Des témoins ordinaires, working, during those years, in Paris, Sao Paulo and Berlin. In 2017, his performance La Bête sparked controversy in Brazil and abroad, when naked, Wagner was touched on the foot by a child of approximately four years of age in the São Paulo Museum of Modern Art. Currently, he resides in Sao Paulo and Paris.

Performances 
 2020 Tumba
 2019 Playlist, with Lorenzo De Angelis
 2019 A Boba (Silly Woman) 
 2018 Public Domain, with Elisabete Finger, Maikon K and Renata Carvalho
 2014 Mal Secreto
 2010 Piranha
 2008 Placebo 2008
 2006 Placebo
 2005 La Bête
 2004 Wagner Ribot Pina Miranda Xavier Le Schwartz Transobjeto (European premiere, 2005, at the festival "Move Berlim", in Berlin)
 2003 Finita

Collaboration 
 2016 Bird in a zoo with Pierre Droulers and Stefan Dreher (Brussels),
 2015 Un petit peu de Zelda (remix) by Yves-Noël Genod (Paris),
 2012 Questions and their Opposite, with Gustavo Bitencourt and Sheila Ribeiro (Curitiba)
 2012 Chic By Accident, by Yves-Noël Genod, with Jeanne Balibar (Paris)
 2009 The Ordinary Witness, by Rachid Ouramdane (Paris)
 2005 Cover, by Rachid Ouramdane (Paris)
 2005 Mein Raum?, with Natali Fari and Ricardo de Paula (Berlin)
 2003 What you wish, what you want, here I am ready to serve you, by Cláudia Müller (Torres Vedras)

Book 
 2018 Nunca juntos mas ao mesmo tempo / Jamais ensemble mais en même temps (Editora Nós)

Films 
 2018 Le genre international, directed by Judith Cahen and Masayasu Eguchi with Maria de Medeiros
 2009 I Needed to get some time, with Rachid Ouramdane
 1996 The Poet, Filminute: The International One-Minute Film Festival, directed by Waltuir Alves

Prizes 
 2021 Fundação Daniel and Nina Carasso / Cité des Arts, Paris
 2013 Prêmio Funarte de Dança Klauss Vianna 
 2012 Best Artistic Project of 2012 for "Piranha", by the Sao Paulo Association of Art Critics
 2012 Funarte Klauss Vianna Dance
 2011 Prêmio Funarte Klauss Vianna 2011
 2010 Rumos Itaú Cultural Dance
 2006 Funarte Klauss Vianna Dance
 2005 Território Minas, FID (Dance International Forum)
 2003 Rumos Itaú Cultural Dance
 2003 XVI Festival de Dança do Triangulo
 2000 Rumos Itaú Cultural Dance
 1996 The International One-Minute Film Festival

Olhares sobre o Corpo [OsC] Festival 
In 2004, he creates, together with Fernanda Bevilaqua, the festival Olhares sobre o Corpo [OsC] ("Perspectives on the Body"). A meeting between artists, students and the people interested on the contemporary relationship in dance, visual arts and performance.

References

External links 
 Official Website

Brazilian male dancers
Living people
20th-century Brazilian dancers
21st-century Brazilian dancers
1972 births